Jordanita horni is a moth of the family Zygaenidae. It is found in Turkey, Armenia, Nakhchivan and northern Iran.

The length of the forewings is 9.1–11 mm for males and 9.2–10 mm for females. Adults are on wing from the end of June to the end of July.

References

C. M. Naumann, W. G. Tremewan: The Western Palaearctic Zygaenidae. Apollo Books, Stenstrup 1999, 

Procridinae
Moths described in 1937